Leon Štukelj (12 November 1898 – 8 November 1999) was a Slovene professional gymnast. He was an Olympic gold medalist and athlete who represented Yugoslavia at the Olympics.

He is a noted figure in Slovenian sporting history. Štukelj is one of the first Slovene athletes to have risen to the very top of his sport, where he remained right from the World Championships in Ljubljana in 1922 all the way to the 1936 Olympic Games in Berlin, at which point he finished his competitive gymnastics career.

Štukelj competed at seven major international competitions and won a total of twenty medals: eight gold, six silver, and six bronze. At the Olympic Games alone he won six medals: two gold medals (counted for Yugoslavia) in Paris in 1924, one gold medal and two bronze in Amsterdam in 1928, and a silver medal in Berlin in 1936.

Biography
Štukelj was born in Novo Mesto, Austria-Hungary (now in Slovenia).

In 1927, Štukelj graduated with a degree in law. Since his youth, he was an active member of the Slovenian Sokol athletic movement. After finishing his sports career, he became a judge, first in his hometown Novo Mesto. Later, he moved to Lenart, and then to Maribor, where he lived until his death. After World War II, Štukelj was not a supporter of the newly formed Communist regime of Yugoslavia. He took part in the Yugoslav royalist (Chetnik) movement, hostile to Tito's partisans, and maintained contacts with the British Special Operations Executive. For these reasons, he was suspicious to the new Communist regime. After the war, he was first imprisoned, then released; but permanently barred from being a judge. He worked as a legal assistant for the rest of his career.

Štukelj was presented at the opening ceremony of the Games of the XXVI Olympiad in Atlanta in 1996 as the oldest living Olympic gold medalist at the time, where he shook hands with the current President of the United States at the time, Bill Clinton. He also presented the medals to winners in the men's team competition.

His one-hundredth birthday in 1998 was a major celebration in Slovenia. Štukelj still exercised regularly until even just before his death, only four days short of his one-hundred and first birthday. He is the longest living individual Olympic gold medalist.

Today a sports hall in Novo Mesto, mainly used by a local basketball team, is named after him, in addition to the University Sports Hall situated on the campus of the University of Maribor.

Hall of Fame 
 (1997) – was inducted into the International Gymnastics Hall of Fame
 (2011) – was inducted into the Slovenian Athletes Hall of Fame

References

External links

 
 
 
 

Yugoslav male artistic gymnasts
Slovenian male artistic gymnasts
Gymnasts at the 1924 Summer Olympics
Gymnasts at the 1928 Summer Olympics
Gymnasts at the 1936 Summer Olympics
Olympic gymnasts of Yugoslavia
Olympic gold medalists for Yugoslavia
Olympic silver medalists for Yugoslavia
Olympic bronze medalists for Yugoslavia
Olympic medalists in gymnastics
Slovenian centenarians
Sportspeople from Novo Mesto
Sportspeople from Maribor
1898 births
1999 deaths
Carniolan people
Medalists at the 1936 Summer Olympics
Medalists at the 1928 Summer Olympics
Medalists at the 1924 Summer Olympics
Slovenian Chetnik personnel of World War II
Men centenarians